The 2010 Buffalo Bulls football team represented the University at Buffalo in the 2010 NCAA Division I FBS football season. The Bulls, led by first-year head coach Jeff Quinn, played their home games at the University at Buffalo Stadium and members of the east division of the Mid-American Conference. They finished the season 2–10, 1–7 in MAC play.

Notable players
 Davonte Shannon, Strong Safety, Three-time First Team All-MAC
 Peter Bittner, Guard, 2009 Second Team All-MAC.
 Steven Means, Defensive End
 Khalil Mack, Linebacker

Previous season

The previous season was a disappointing one for the UB Bulls:  Following 2008's MAC Championship, UB was expected to challenge for the conference championship again in 2009.  But before the season even started, bad luck struck the team as star running back James Starks injured the labrum in his left shoulder in a pre-season scrimmage.  It was determined that he would need surgery and miss the whole year. The offense also struggled without four-year starting quarterback Drew Willy as new starter Zach Maynard had an up-and-down season.  The defense was unable to force as many turnovers as it did in 2008 and still struggled to stop opposing offenses as coach Turner Gill's decision to replace defensive coordinator Jimmy Williams with defensive back coach Fred Reed did not pay off.  The team was out of MAC championship and bowl contention by mid-season and finished 5-7.  Despite the setback, Gill was hired away by Kansas.  Two weeks after Gill left, UB announced the hiring of Quinn, the offensive coordinator for the then-undefeated and 3rd ranked Cincinnati Bearcats football team. In the Sugar Bowl the Bearcats lost to the Florida Gators.

Recruiting

Schedule

Roster

NFL Draft
5th Round, 143rd Overall Pick by the Dallas Cowboys—Sr. CB Josh Thomas

References

Buffalo
Buffalo Bulls football seasons
Buffalo Bulls football